A papillary tumor is a tumor shaped like a small mushroom, with its stem attached to the epithelial layer (inner lining) of an organ.

References

External links 
 Papillary tumor entry in the public domain NCI Dictionary of Cancer Terms

Types of neoplasia